Chapada dos Guimarães is a municipality located in central Brazil, 62 km from the city of Cuiabá, the capital of Mato Grosso State. It is home to the Chapada dos Guimarães National Park. Outside this town is the geographic center of South America.

The municipality contains 77% of the  Rio da Casca Ecological Station, a strictly protected conservation unit created in 1994.
The municipal seat contains the  Quineira State Park, created in 2006.

References

External links 

 Chapada dos Guimarães website

Municipalities in Mato Grosso